Gabolani (also misspelled as Gabulani or Gabul) (also Romanized as Gabolānī; also known as Ayūb Bāzār) is a village in Bahu Kalat Rural District, Dashtiari District, Chabahar County, Sistan and Baluchestan Province, Iran. At the 2006 census, its population was 369, in 55 families.

References 

Populated places in Chabahar County